Epoufette Island is an island in Lake Michigan. It is located in Hendricks Township, in Mackinac County, Michigan. The community of Epoufette is north of the island.

Notes

Islands of Mackinac County, Michigan
Islands of Lake Michigan in Michigan